Sophia Kianni (born December 13, 2001) is an Iranian-American climate activist. She is the executive director of Climate Cardinals and the youngest member of the United Nations Secretary-General's Youth Advisory Group on Climate Change.

Activism 

Kianni became interested in climate activism while in Middle School in Tehran when one night the stars were obscured by smog. Kianni described it as "a signal that our world is heating up at a terrifying pace." She later joined Greta Thunberg's group, Fridays for Future, and took time off from school to support action on climate change. She also helped organize the 2019 Black Friday climate strike. In 2019 she became a national strategist for Fridays for Future and national partnerships coordinator for Zero Hour.

In November 2019, Kianni skipped school to join a group of protesters organized by Extinction Rebellion who intended to stage a week-long hunger strike and sit-in at the Washington, D.C., office of Speaker of the House Nancy Pelosi, demanding that she speak with them for an hour on camera about climate change. Locally, there were roughly a dozen participants; at 17 years old, Kianni was the youngest, and one of two women. Kianni was not a member of XR, and only participated in the first day of the sit-in, but gave a prepared speech and interviews to the press, and continued the hunger strike remotely. Kianni wrote about her participation in the protest for Teen Vogue. In February 2020, Kianni was named a spokesperson for Extinction Rebellion.

In 2020, Kianni's physical activism was curtailed by the school closing and social distancing requirements of the COVID-19 pandemic, and her scheduled speaking engagements at colleges including Stanford University, Princeton University and Duke University were delayed. Kianni was able to continue her activism remotely with her talk at Michigan Technological University. In addition, Kianni decided to accelerate development of a planned website, Climate Cardinals, that would translate climate change information into different languages.
 
In July 2020, Kianni was named by United Nations Secretary-General António Guterres to his new Youth Advisory Group on Climate Change, a group of seven young climate leaders to advise him on action for the climate crisis. Kianni was the youngest in the group, which ranged from 18 to 28 years old. She was the only one representing the United States, and also the only one representing the Middle East and Iran.

In September 2021, Kianni was one of 4 co-chairs of the Youth4Climate event in Milan, preliminary to the 2021 United Nations Climate Change Conference or COP26. Climate Cardinals translated the resulting Youth4Climate manifesto into the 6 official languages of the United Nations. At COP26 itself, in November 2021 in Glasgow, Kianni spoke at several panels, and met with António Guterres, Secretary-General of the United Nations. In October 2022, Kianni was covered by Vogue Arabia for representing the UN and speaking at COP27 in Sharm el-Sheikh, Egypt.

Recognition 

In December 2020, Kianni was named one of Vice magazine's Motherboard 20 Humans of 2020, for being the U.S representative for United Nations Youth Advisory Group on Climate Change and starting Climate Cardinals. In December 2021, Kianni was named one of Teen Vogue'''s "21 under 21" for her climate activism. In November 2022, she was named one of the Forbes 30 Under 30 for Climate Activism for 2023.

 Public Speaking 
Kianni has spoken at several conferences around the world, including Web Summit, the 2022 Arch Summit, Washington Post Live, BBYO Insider, Public Interest Environmental Law Conference, New York Times Events' Climate Hub, and TED Countdown.    

 Climate Cardinals 
Climate Cardinals is an international youth-led non-profit organization founded by Kianni in 2020 to offer information about climate change in every language. It was named for the northern cardinal, the state bird of Virginia, and a metaphor for information flying around the world. Kianni was inspired by the years she spent translating English-language climate change articles into Persian for her Iranian relatives, as Iranian media barely covered the subject. She says she noticed informational content about climate change is either available only in English, or at best in Chinese and Spanish, which made them inaccessible to speakers of other languages.

Climate Cardinals was launched in May 2020, and had 1100 volunteers sign up to become translators on its first day. They also partnered with Radio Javan, an Iranian language radio with over 10 million followers, to share graphics and translations with Iranians. Climate Cardinals is sponsored by the International Student Environmental Coalition as a 501(c)(3) nonprofit, which allows students who participate in its translations to earn community service hours for their work, either fulfilling school requirements or improving college applications. By August 2020,  the group had over 5,000 volunteers, with an average age of 16. By December 2020, it had 8,000 volunteers and partnerships with UNICEF and Translators Without Borders. The organization has reached over 350,000 people with over 750,000 words of climate information translated.

 Journalism 
Kianni wrote a 2019 article for Teen Vogue about the Pelosi office hunger strike. In 2020, she wrote two articles about the effects of the coronavirus, for the Middle East edition of Cosmopolitan magazine about the effects on her extended family's celebration of Nowruz, and another for Refinery29 about the effects on her daily schedule as a climate activist, which was widely syndicated. She wrote an article for MTV News for the 50th anniversary of Earth Day, which she helped coordinate, and another in 2022 for The Washington Post about how she lives sustainably in college.

In 2021, Kianni began hosting a podcast for The New Fashion Initiative, interviewing experts involved in the fashion industry about addressing climate change.

 Personal life 
Kianni lives with her mother, father, younger sister, and two pet lovebirds, in McLean, Virginia. She studied at Henry Wadsworth Longfellow Middle School, where her team won the statewide Science Olympiad, and at Thomas Jefferson High School for Science and Technology, where she was a National Merit Scholarship Program semifinalist. After graduating from high school in 2020, she attended Indiana University. She transferred to Stanford University in 2021, where she is majoring in Science, Technology, & Society and studies climate science and health policy.

Kianni received extensive media attention as an example of a teenager reacting to the social distancing measures related to the COVID-19 pandemic: CNN, Time magazine, and The Washington Post'' wrote about how she and her friends were moving personal interaction and even their physically cancelled senior prom to Zoom video chats, and TikTok videos.

References

External links 

 

2001 births
21st-century American women
Activists from Virginia
American people of Iranian descent
American women environmentalists
Climate activists
Living people
American child activists
American environmentalists
American women writers
Youth climate activists
Thomas Jefferson High School for Science and Technology alumni